P. Kay Floyd (born 1958/1959) is an American politician who represents the 46th district in the Oklahoma Senate. A Democrat, her district includes parts of Oklahoma City. She was first elected to the Oklahoma House of Representatives in the 2012 state election and took office on November 14, 2012.

Floyd is the first openly lesbian representative elected to the Oklahoma legislature, and the second LGBT person following Sen. Al McAffrey, who she succeeded in both the House and the Senate.

Education
Floyd received a B.S. in Psychology from Oklahoma State University in 1980, followed by a J.D. from the University of Oklahoma College of Law in 1983.

Professional experience
Floyd has had the following professional experience:
Judge, Special Municipal Court, 1991–Present
Judge, State Administrative Law Judge, 1991–Present
Adjunct Professor, Oklahoma State University
Attorney, Senior Citizen Division of Legal Aid

See also
List of first women lawyers and judges in Oklahoma

References

External links

21st-century American politicians
21st-century American women politicians
LGBT state legislators in Oklahoma
Living people
Democratic Party members of the Oklahoma House of Representatives
Democratic Party Oklahoma state senators
Oklahoma State University alumni
Politicians from Oklahoma City
University of Oklahoma College of Law alumni
Women state legislators in Oklahoma
Year of birth missing (living people)